Elizabeth "Liz" Stephen (born January 12, 1987, in East Montpelier, Vermont) is a retired American cross-country skier who competed between 2005 and 2018.

Career
At the FIS Nordic World Ski Championships 2009 in Liberec, Stephen had her best finish of 14th in the 4 x 5 km relay and her best individual finish of 15th in the 7.5 km + 7.5 km double pursuit.

It was announced on 19 January 2010 that she had qualified for the 2010 Winter Olympics where she finished 50th in the 10 km and 58th in the 15 km mixed pursuit.

At the FIS Nordic World Ski Championships 2011 in Oslo, Stephen finished 16th in the Women's 30 kilometre Freestyle, as the first of the four Americans in the class, with a time of 1:30:07.

Stephen was named to the U.S. team for the 2014 Winter Olympics. In the 15 kilometer skiathlon, she placed 12th (out of 61 competitors) with a time of 40:09.6.

In the 2015 Tour de Ski, she finished 5th in the overall ranking, also recording her best World Cup performance.

She announced her retirement from cross-country skiing in April 2018.

Cross-country skiing results
All results are sourced from the International Ski Federation (FIS).

Olympic Games

World Championships

World Cup

Season standings

Individual podiums
6 podiums – (2 , 4 )

Team podiums
 4 podiums – (4 )

References

External links 
 
 
 
 

1987 births
Living people
American female cross-country skiers
Cross-country skiers at the 2010 Winter Olympics
Cross-country skiers at the 2014 Winter Olympics
Cross-country skiers at the 2018 Winter Olympics
Tour de Ski skiers
Olympic cross-country skiers of the United States
Sportspeople from Vermont
21st-century American women